The Numbers Band (a.k.a. 15-60-75) are an American blues rock and experimental rock band formed in Kent, Ohio, United States in 1969. They are part of the 'Akron Sound' that sprang forth from their home state.

Career
The original personnel were Robert Kidney (guitar, lead vocals), the Pretenders' Chrissie Hynde's brother Terry Hynde (saxophone), Hank Smith (guitar, keyboards), Greg Colbert (bass) and Tim Hudson (drums). Chris Butler, from Tin Huey and The Waitresses, also played in the band for a stint as a bassist. They premiered as a live act at the local nightspot The Kove in July 1970. Later, they incorporated jazzy influences as well and they have stuck with their sound ever since.

By 1972, Gerald Casale, future co-founder of Devo (bass), and David Robinson were added to the lineup. Casale was thrown out after wearing a monkey mask onstage. Due to interior pressures, Kidney terminated the project by year's end and joined his brother Jack's band, King of Hearts. However, King of Hearts reformed as a new Numbers Band a few weeks later with a retooled lineup that consisted of the Kidney brothers, Hynde, Drake Gleason (bass) and Jay Brown (drums). After two years of playing gigs, Brown left the band and Robinson came back. Michael Stacey (guitar), was added prior to the cutting of their 1976 live album Jimmy Bell's Still in Town. The following year, Gleason was replaced by Bart Johnson (bass). The Numbers Band, like most of the other Ohioans, never became renowned nationally and were not signed by the major labels.

The second album, the band's first studio recording, 15 60 75 The Numbers Band 2, was not released until 1982. The next year, its single, "Here in the Life", was released through Pere Ubu's David Thomas' label, Hearpen. Subsequently, Fred Tribuzzo took over the bass playing from Johnson.

The Golden Palominos did their own rendition of the Kidney composition "The Animal Speaks" from Jimmy Bell in 1985. Robert Kidney toured with the Palominos the following year.

The third Numbers Band album, Among The Wandering, was released in 1987.  Despite some local success and radio airplay of the single "High Heels Are Dangerous", they remained only locally-known. Stacey departed in February 1989, but he was not replaced. In 1990, Robert Kidney received a kidney transplant, necessitated by a birth defect and complicated by years of hard living. Blues by the Numbers, their second live album, showed up the following year, as did the retrospective, 15 60 75 Twenty. A new studio effort, Hotwire, emerged in 1992, but nothing else was forthcoming for the rest of the decade.

Robert and Jack Kidney performed with David Thomas and his "Mirror Man" stage production at the South Bank Center, London in 1998.  The brothers also toured with the troupe in the Netherlands and Canada, and again in Los Angeles in 2003.  The entire Numbers Band performed at the South Bank Center in 2000.

The band, now composed of the Kidney brothers, Hynde, Bill Watson (bass) and Frank Casamento (drums), are still going strong playing in their hometown circuit today. In 2003, The Numbers Band were among the rockers profiled in the PBS documentary It's Everything, And Then It's Gone. Their latest album, Inward City, was released in 2009.

In 2010, Anton Fier reunited the Golden Palominos for a limited number of shows in New York City.  Robert Kidney joined the performances at The Living Room and Le Poisson Rouge.

In 2011, drummer Frank Casamento left the band, relocating to Chicago.  Clint Alguire replaced him, and the band continues to perform and evolve as they approach a 50-year anniversary.
Robert Kidney was awarded the Cleveland Arts Prize Lifetime Achievement Award for Music in 2012.  The CAP created this video of Robert for their web site...Cleveland Arts Prize, Robert Kidney.

The Kidney Brothers (Robert & Jack) released their first duet CD, "Coal Tattoo", on ReR Megacorp Records in 2013, available at numbersband.com.  Also in 2013, the re-release of their first LP, "Jimmy Bell's Still in Town" is available as a deluxe double vinyl LP (from Exit Stencil Recordings) with three extra tracks which were recorded in the same time period.  The band traveled to New York City in December 2013 to perform songs from the album at the Bowery Electric. Long time fan David Fricke from Rolling Stone was in attendance.  David wrote the liner notes for the re-release.

Robert Kidney released his first solo effort in early 2016, "JackLeg", a collection of songs written by Robert with acoustic guitar, recorded at Studio G in Brooklyn, NY (released by Exit Stencil Records).

The Numbers Band celebrated their 45th Anniversary at The Kent Stage in Kent, Ohio on October 3, 2015.

In 2020, they released a CD recorded live in the studio titled “Endure: Outliers on Water Street”.  And on February 28 they celebrated their 50th Anniversary at the Kent Stage, performing to a sold-out crowd.

Members

Current
 Robert Kidney (founder, guitar, vocals, songwriter)
 Jack Kidney (harmonica, saxophone, guitar, keyboards, percussion, vocals, songwriter)
 Terry Hynde (saxophone)
 Bill Watson (bass)
 Clint Alguire (drums)

Former
 Chris Butler (bass)
 Hank Smith (guitar, keyboards)
 Greg Colbert (bass)
 Tim Hudson (drums)
 Michael Bubnow (guitar, bass)
 Gerald Casale (bass)
 Rod Reisman (drums)
 Tim Maglione (sax)
 David Robinson (drums)
 Drake Gleason (bass)
 Jay Brown (drums)
 Michael Stacey (guitar)
 Bart Johnson (bass)
 Fred Tribuzzo (bass)
 Frank Reynolds (bass)
 Frank Casamento (drums)

Discography
 Jimmy Bell's Still in Town (live) (1976) (Hearthen)
 15 60 75 The Numbers Band 2 (1982) (Water Brothers)
 Among the Wandering (1987) (Water Brothers)
 15 60 75 20 (1991) (Reedurban)
 Blues By the Numbers (live) (1991) (Reedurban)
 Hotwire (1992) (Reedurban)
 Inward City (2009) (Hearthen)
 Coal Tattoo (2013) (ReR Megacorp)
 Jimmy Bell's Still in Town (reissue) (2013) (Exit Stencil Recordings)
 Endure: Outliers on Water Street (2020) (15-60-75)''

All recordings are available at numbersband.com.

References

External links
 Official website
 [ The Numbers Band] at Allmusic

American blues rock musical groups
American experimental rock groups
Musical groups established in 1969
Musical groups from Kent, Ohio
Rock music groups from Ohio
Warner Records artists